Yaeum Market is a traditional street market in Nam-gu, Ulsan, South Korea. Established in 1976, today the market has more than 210 shops that sell fruits, vegetables, meat, fish, breads, clothing, and Korean traditional medicinal items. The market is also home to many small restaurants and street food stalls.

Renovations
Due to the emergence of large discount stores in Ulsan, the city government began a market-revival initiative in the mid-2000s to improve the infrastructure around Ulsan's traditional markets, while attempting to maintain their traditional atmosphere. The renovations for Yaeum Market completed in October 2005 and included the installation of a 300-meter long, 8 m wide arcade to keep shoppers dry in rainy weather. The cost of the project was KRW317,000,000 (US$317,000 in 2005).

See also
 List of markets in South Korea
 List of South Korean tourist attractions

References

External links
Official website for Yaeum Market 

Nam District, Ulsan
Retail markets in Ulsan
Food markets in South Korea